Horace Cope (24 May 1899 – 4 October 1961) was an English footballer who played at left back.

Cope spent six years at Arsenal after joining from Notts County for £3,125 in December 1926. He was a regular in his first two-and-a-half seasons at the club. In total, he made 76 starts at Arsenal, but missed the club's 1927 FA Cup Final defeat to Cardiff through injury after playing most of the season. He joined Bristol Rovers for £1,500 in July 1933.

Honours

As a player
Arsenal

FA Cup finalist — 1927

References

1899 births
1961 deaths
English footballers
Association football defenders
Arsenal F.C. players